Mark Hansen may refer to:

Mark Henry Hansen, American statistician and data journalist
Mark Victor Hansen (born 1948), American author and motivational speaker
Mark Hansen, a suspect in the Black Dahlia murder

See also
Marc Hansen (disambiguation)
Mark Hanson (disambiguation)